Govt. E. Raghvendra Rao P.G. Science College, Bilaspur or P.G.Science College, Bilaspur is a college located in Bilaspur, Chhattisgarh, India. It is an Autonomous College under Atal Bihari Vajpayee Vishwavidyalaya, Bilaspur.

College was declared "Centre with Potential of Academic Excellence" by the University Grants Commission in 2008. It was accredited grade"A" by the National Assessment and Accreditation Council (NAAC) in 2015.

History
Established in 1972 as  Science College, it was affiliated to Pandit Ravishankar Shukla University, Raipur. In 1983, college became affiliated to newly formed Guru Ghasidas University. In 1986, college became Govt. Model Science P.G. College.

See also
Government E. Raghvendra Rao Post Graduate College Bilaspur
Model College Bilaspur
Science College Raipur

References

External links
 

Education in Bilaspur, Chhattisgarh
Educational institutions established in 1972
1972 establishments in Madhya Pradesh